Cantharidic acid is a selective inhibitor of PP2A (protein phosphatase 2) and PP1 (protein phosphatase 1).

It is the hydrolysis product of cantharidin.

References

Phosphatase inhibitors